Williamsburg is an unincorporated community in Dorchester County on the Eastern Shore of the U.S. state of Maryland.

Notable people
Jim Stevens, a Washington Senators baseball player in 1914, was born in Williamsburg in 1889.

References

External links

Populated places in Dorchester County, Maryland